Acsa is a village in , Hungary.

Location

Population
Most of Acsa's population is Slovakian.

Communications
Route 2108 serves the village by road from Aszód and Balassagyarmat.
Stopping trains of the Hungarian State Railways serve the village on line 78 (Aszód–Balassagyarmat–Ipolytarnóc). Acsa and Erdőkürt share a station ("Acsa-Erdőkürt"), between Püspökhatvan and Galgaguta.

History
The first known mention of the village as "Acha" was in 1341. At that time the village was owned by the Achai family and from  1422 it was  the Palatine Miklós Garai's property. During  Turkish rule (see Ottoman Hungary) the village was demolished, but later on Slovaks settled. From 1730 the village was the Prónay family's land.

Landmarks

 The baroque Prónay castle, which was built around 1775 by Giovanni Battista Carlone (it is in Acsaújlak, but is not open to visitors)
 The Roman Catholic church, built in 1747
 The village museum

Famous people
Sándor Prónay, knight and chamberlain, was born in Acsa in 1760.

References

External links
 Welcoming (Vendégváró) 
  Photos (Légifotók Acsáról) 
 Acsa, village at Cserhát foot (Acsa, falu a Cserhát lábánál) 
 Acsa 
 Acsa Evangelical Congregation (Acsai Evangélikus Egyházközség) 

 

Populated places in Pest County